The Elite was a single-screen theater, situated in S.N. Banerjee Road, Kolkata. It had started operation on August 2, 1940. It was once owned by 20th Century Fox and photographic studio Bourne & Shepherd and had its share of silver screen legends like Raj Kapoor, Amitabh Bachchan and Shah Rukh Khan to name a few. The 78-year old auditorium in central Kolkata ended its journey on 1 June, 2018.

References

Former cinemas
Cinemas in Kolkata
Cinema of Bengal